The Arnhem–Leeuwarden railway is a railway line in the Netherlands running from Arnhem to Leeuwarden, passing through Deventer, Zwolle and Heerenveen. It is also called the Staatslijn A ("state line A") in Dutch. The part between Arnhem and Zwolle is sometimes called the IJssellijn ("IJssel line").

History
The line opened between 1865 and 1868. During the Second World War, the tracks between Deventer and Olst were removed by the German occupiers following the national railway strike from 1944 onwards. It had been a double-track section like the rest of the line, but was replaced post-war by a single track due to costs.

Stations
The main interchange stations on the Arnhem–Leeuwarden railway are:

Arnhem: to Cologne, Utrecht, Tiel, Nijmegen and 's-Hertogenbosch
Zutphen: to Apeldoorn, Winterswijk and Hengelo
Deventer: to Apeldoorn, Utrecht, Almelo and Berlin
Zwolle: to Groningen, Kampen, Amersfoort, Almelo and Emmen
Steenwijk: 
Meppel: to Groningen
Leeuwarden: to Groningen, Harlingen and Stavoren

Closed stations

Ittersum, Herculo, Windesheim, Herxen, Wijnvoorden, Bovendorp, De Boerhaar, Diepenveen West, Rande, De Platvoet, Boksbergerweg, Snippeling, Colmschate, Epse, Gorssel, Eefde, Hungerink-Mettray, Nieuwstad, Hoven, Voorstonden, Het Vosje, Weg naar Voorst, Leuvenheim, Spankeren, Villa Hofstetten, Ellecom, Klein Avegoor, Diepesteeg, Holleweg, Hotel Den Engel, De Steeg, Worth-Rheden, Hotel Naeff, Cafe Unie and Plattenburg.

Train services
The following train services use part of the Arnhem–Leeuwarden railway:
intercity service The Hague/Rotterdam - Utrecht - Amersfoort - Zwolle - Steenwijk - Leeuwarden
intercity service Schiphol - Hilversum - Amersfoort - Zwolle - Steenwijk - Leeuwarden
intercity service Zwolle - Deventer - Arnhem - Nijmegen - 's-Hertogenbosch - Roosendaal 
local service (sprinter) Nijmegen - Arnhem - Zutphen
local service (stoptrein) Zwolle - Assen - Groningen

External links 
 

Railway lines in the Netherlands
Standard gauge railways in the Netherlands
Railway lines opened in 1865